A pitch clock is used in college baseball and Minor League Baseball to limit the amount of time a pitcher uses before he throws the ball to the hitter. This is one measure that has accelerated the pace of play. Major League Baseball (MLB) will begin using a pitch clock in the  season.

History
In college baseball, the Southeastern Conference experimented with using pitch clocks in 2010. Pitchers were given twenty seconds to throw the pitch, or a ball would be added to the count. Similarly, a batter stepping out of the batter's box with less than five seconds on the clock will be assessed an additional strike. After the 2010 season, the National Collegiate Athletic Association sought to make the pitch clocks mandatory, and instituted it for the 2011 college baseball season, but only for when there are no runners on base.

Pitch clocks made their professional debut in the Arizona Fall League in 2014. On January 15, 2015, Major League Baseball (MLB) announced it would institute a 20-second pitch clock in Minor League Baseball for Double-A and Triple-A teams during the 2015 season. Pitchers were given twenty seconds to throw the pitch, with the penalty of a ball awarded to the batter if not followed. Along with other rule changes addressing the pace of play, the clocks contributed to a 12-minute reduction in game times at those levels between the 2014 and 2015 seasons, compared to the leagues that did not use the clock, which saw game times change from an increase of three minutes per game to a decrease in five minutes per game. Game times increased in 2016 and 2017, but were still faster than games in 2014. The independent Atlantic League began using a 12-second pitch clock.

MLB and the MLB Players Association (MLBPA) discussed the possibility of introducing the pitch clock at the major league level for the 2018 season. MLB opted against imposing it unilaterally, over the opposition of the MLBPA. MLB implemented a 20-second pitch clock in spring training games in 2019. The collective bargaining agreement reached to end the 2021–22 Major League Baseball lockout included the possibility of introducing a pitch clock as of the 2023 MLB season. Four active players, six persons appointed by MLB, and one umpire were formed into a Joint Competition Committee to review and recommend any changes to playing rules.

On September 8, 2022, MLB announced a set of rules changes that will take effect in 2023, including the use of a pitch clock. Pitchers will have 15 seconds between pitches when there are no baserunners and 20 seconds when there is at least one baserunner. Additionally, the batter will have seven seconds to be in the stance, ready to hit, otherwise a strike will be called. The clock starts when the pitcher gets the ball and the catcher and batter are ready.

In addition to its primary use to time pitches, the clock is also used to indicate the time remaining in a media timeout for commercials (usually between each half of an inning), and will also be used to time the warmup period on the mound for a relief pitcher coming out of the bullpen. There will also be multiple clocks displayed throughout a major league stadium on the same timing system allow full visibility of the pitch clock for players, coaches, umpires, press, and spectators throughout the venue, with implementation within the graphics of television broadcasts to be determined at the start of the season.

See also
Play clock
Shot clock

References

External links

Baseball terminology
Baseball rules
Time measurement systems
Timers